Warsaw is a town in Wyoming County, in the U.S. state of New York. The population was 5,064 at the 2010 census. It is located approximately 37 miles east southeast of Buffalo and approximately 37 miles southwest of Rochester. The town may have been named after Warsaw, Poland.

The Town of Warsaw is centrally located in the county and contains a village, also called Warsaw. The village is the county seat of Wyoming County.

History 

The Town of Warsaw was founded in 1803 from the Town of Batavia (in Genesee County).  In 1812, part of Warsaw was used to form the new town of Town of Middlebury.  Again in 1814, Warsaw was reduced to form the Town of Gainesville.

Abolitionism
In the decades before the American Civil War, Warsaw was a center of abolitionist sentiment and activity. Warsaw's local anti-slavery society was formed in 1833, the same year as the American Anti-Slavery Society. Several homes and churches are documented to have participated in the Underground Railroad. In November 1839 the anti-slavery Liberty Party was formed in a meeting at Warsaw's Presbyterian Church.  The area sent abolitionists Seth M. Gates and Augustus Frank to serve in the United States Congress. An anti-slavery newspaper called The American Citizen was published in Warsaw.

Geography

Oatka Creek flows northward through the Wyoming Valley in the town. U.S. Route 20A crosses the town.

Demographics

As of the census of 2000, there were 5,423 people, 2,113 households, and 1,354 families residing in the town.  The population density was 153.1 people per square mile (59.1/km2).  There were 2,232 housing units at an average density of 63.0 per square mile (24.3/km2).  The racial makeup of the town was 97.29% White, 0.39% Black or African American, 0.31% Native American, 0.94% Asian, 0.09% from other races, and 0.98% from two or more races. Hispanic or Latino of any race were 0.68% of the population.

There were 2,113 households, out of which 31.4% had children under the age of 18 living with them, 49.3% were married couples living together, 11.0% had a female householder with no husband present, and 35.9% were non-families. 30.3% of all households were made up of individuals, and 14.8% had someone living alone who was 65 years of age or older.  The average household size was 2.39 and the average family size was 2.98.

In the town, the population was spread out, with 23.9% under the age of 18, 7.4% from 18 to 24, 27.3% from 25 to 44, 22.3% from 45 to 64, and 19.1% who were 65 years of age or older.  The median age was 39 years. For every 100 females, there were 89.2 males.  For every 100 females age 18 and over, there were 84.3 males.

The median income for a household in the town was $37,699, and the median income for a family was $42,647. Males had a median income of $31,672 versus $21,691 for females. The per capita income for the town was $17,279.  About 8.5% of families and 10.6% of the population were below the poverty line, including 17.4% of those under age 18 and 6.6% of those age 65 or over.

Government 
The Town of Warsaw is governed by a town council elected by popular vote.

Communities and locations in the Town of Warsaw 
East Warsaw – a community east of the village
 Monument Circle Historic District – is listed on the National Register of Historic Places.
Newburg – a hamlet near the south town line on Route 19
Oatka – a hamlet southeast of Warsaw village
Perry - Warsaw Municipal Airport ( 01G ) – a general aviation airport east of the village of Warsaw on Route 20A
Pierce Corners – a settlement in the northwest part of the town
Rock Glen – a hamlet south of Warsaw village on Route 19
  Seth M. Gates House – a historic house in Warsaw
South Warsaw – a hamlet south of Warsaw on Route 19
Thompsons Crossing – a hamlet in the northwest part of the town
 Warsaw – village of Warsaw on Route 20A

Notable people 

 James C. Adamson, former NASA astronaut and retired Colonel of the United States Army 
 Edward J. Boomer, former Wisconsin State Assemblyman
 Earl Alonzo Brininstool, cowboy poet
 Barber Conable (1922 - 2003) - Ten-term United States Congressman and later World Bank President.
 Ice Box Chamberlain, former MLB pitcher
 Ben Doller, poet, writer
 James Rood Doolittle (January 3, 1815 – July 27, 1897), U.S. Senator from Wisconsin, District Attorney of Wyoming County, NY; Colonel of the New York State Militia;
 Sydney Nettleton Fisher, Middle East historian
 Jabez G. Fitch, U.S. Marshal for Vermont
 Augustus Frank (1826 – 1895) was a United States Representative from New York during the American Civil War
 Merrill Edwards Gates, ninth President of Rutgers College (now Rutgers University), sixth President of Amherst College
 Seth M. Gates, former US Congressman
 Lester H. Humphrey, former New York State Senator 
 Andrew J. Lorish (November 8, 1832–August 11, 1897), a Medal of Honor recipient for his actions in the American Civil War, died in Warsaw, New York.
 John Warwick Montgomery (born 1931) - Emeritus Professor of Law and Humanities, writer, lecturer, and public debater in the field of Christian apologetics
 William Patterson, former US Congressman
 Diann Roffe, former World Cup alpine ski racer
 Martin Smallwood, former football coach
 Zera Luther Tanner, former naval commander, inventor

References

External links 

 
 City-Data.com
 ePodunk
	
	

Towns in Wyoming County, New York
Populated places established in 1803
1803 establishments in New York (state)